Anti Pukara (Quechua anti east, pukara fortress, hispanicized spelling Antipucara) is a mountain in the Andes of Peru, about  high. It is located in the Cusco Region, Canchis Province, Pitumarca District. Anti Pukara lies southeast of Urqu Puñuna. It is situated near the Yanamayu, a left tributary of the Ch'illkamayu whose waters flow to the Willkanuta River.

References

Mountains of Peru
Mountains of Cusco Region